Now You See It… (Now You Don't) is an album by Michael Brecker. It was recorded in 1990 and released by GRP Records.

Recording and music 
The album was recorded in 1990. It was Brecker's third as leader. The personnel and composers varied from track to track.

Release and reception 

Now You See It… (Now You Don't) was released by GRP Records. AllMusic awarded the album 4 stars and its review by Scott Yanow states: "Most of the originals (either by Brecker, Beard, or producer Don Grolnick) project moods rather than feature strong melodies, but Michael Brecker's often-raging tenor makes the most of each opportunity".

Track listing 
All tracks composed by Michael Brecker; except where indicated
"Escher Sketch (A Tale of Two Rhythms)" – 5:23
"Minsk" (Don Grolnick) – 9:03
"Ode to The Doo Da Day" (Jim Beard) – 5:51
"Never Alone" – 5:35
"Peep" – 7:25
"Dogs In The Wine Shop" (Don Grolnick) – 6:33
"Quiet City" (Jim Beard) – 6:04
"The Meaning of the Blues" (Bobby Troup, Leah Worth) – 5:57

Personnel
 Michael Brecker – tenor saxophone, EWI
 Jon Herington – guitar
 Joey Calderazzo – piano
 Jim Beard – synthesizer, keyboards
 Victor Bailey – electric bass
 Jay Anderson – acoustic bass
 Adam Nussbaum – drums 
 Don Alias – percussion
 Steve Berrios – percussion
 Milton Cardona – percussion
 Omar Hakim – percussion

References

1990 albums
Michael Brecker albums
GRP Records albums